Left on Labrador, alternatively titled The Cruise of the Schooner-yacht Curlew, is a novel by author C. A. Stephens as part of his Camping-Out Series. It was first published by James R. Osgood in 1872, and later by the New York Hurst and Company Publishers in 1873.

References

Novels set in Newfoundland and Labrador
1872 American novels